Borth is an unincorporated community in Waushara County, Wisconsin, United States. The community is located at the intersection of County D and County XX, near the town of Poy Sippi. Lake Poygan and marsh lie to the north along Willow Creek. 
The community was named in April 1892 by and for August Borth, the first postmaster and owner of a local cheese factory.

References

Unincorporated communities in Waushara County, Wisconsin
Unincorporated communities in Wisconsin